At the 1904 Summer Olympics in St. Louis, a roque tournament was contested. It was the only time that roque was included in the Olympic program.

Participating nations
4 players from the host nation competed.

Results

The competitors played a double round-robin tournament, with each player facing every other player twice.

Source: Sports Reference.

Medal table

See also
Croquet at the 1900 Summer Olympics
List of Olympic venues in discontinued events

References

Sources
International Olympic Committee results database
Roque at the 1904 St. Louis Summer Games at Sports-reference.com

1904 Summer Olympics events
Croquet at the Summer Olympics
Discontinued sports at the Summer Olympics
Roque
1904 in croquet
Croquet in the United States
Men's events at the 1904 Summer Olympics